The Bolivarian Militia of Venezuela, is a militia branch of the National Bolivarian Armed Forces of Venezuela. Its headquarters is at the National Military Museum, Fort Montana, Caracas. The Commanding General of the National Militia is Major General Carlos Augusto Leal Tellería, Venezuelan Army, as of March 2018. The National Militia celebrates its anniversary every April 13 yearly.

Mission 
According to the Article 46 of the organic law establishing the Militia, its functions are:
 Enlist, organize, equip, instruct, train and retrain formed units of the National Bolivarian Militia;
 Establish permanent links between the National Bolivarian Armed Forces and the Venezuelan people, in order to contribute to ensuring the overall defence of Venezuela;
 Organize and train the Territorial Militia's personnel and unit to implement the comprehensive defense operations to ensure the defense of sovereignty and national independence;
 Contribute to the Operational Strategic Command, in the development and implementation of plans for integral defence of the Nation and National Mobilization;
 Participate and contribute to the development of technology and military industry, without restrictions other than those provided for in the Constitution of the Republic and the laws;
 Guide, coordinate and support community councils in the areas of competence in order to assist in the implementation of public policies;
 Contribute and advise on the establishment and consolidation of integral defence committees of communal councils in order to strengthen the civil-military union;
 Collect, process and disseminate information and consolidation of community councils, public institutions and private sector, necessary for the development of plans, programs, projects of integral development of the Nation and National Mobilization;
 Coordinate with the organs, bodies and agencies of the public and private sectors, the creation and organization of the Combatant Corps, which administratively depend thereon, in order to contribute to the overall defence of the Nation; supervise and train the Combatant Corps, which report directly to Headquarters, National Militia,
 Other duties specified by laws and regulations of the Republic as authorized by proper authorities and enacted by the National Assembly.

Organization
The General Command of the National Militia is divided in three branches of its own plus a fourth branch divided into the first two:
 The National Reserve Service, consisting of all Venezuelan citizens who are not in active military service, or have completed national military service, or who voluntarily join the reserve units (all active reserve units are not part of the NM but of the service branches of the NAF)
 The Territorial Guard Component, consisting of all Venezuelan citizens who voluntarily serve to organize local resistance to any external threat to the nation. These are divided into the Special Resistance Combatant Corps, aimed at the wartime and peacetime defense of public institutions and state and private enterprises, and the Workers' Territorial Militia Components divided into:
 General Employment Militia Detachments, the mobile quick action component stationed in all the states of Venezuela, metropolitan areas and cities
 Territorial Employment Militia Battalions, stationed strategically in key cities and townships in Venezuela and areas of key importance
 Community Militia Detachments, stationed in all townships and cities in all the states of Venezuela, mandated to keep the public order and defend government institutions and economical assets like factories
 Rural Employment Militia Battalions, stationed in all public farmlands
 The People's Navy Branch, raised in 2013, which is the naval militia component that is mandated towards the defense of the Venezuelan coastline and  territorial waters, itself divided into the Naval Reserve Command (part of the NRS) and the Workers' Naval Employment Territorial Militia Battalions, part of the TGC
 The People's National Defense Corps, raised in 2018, which serves as the operational reserve of the National Armed Forces in protecting public order and security

Today the General Command of the National Militia is organized on the basis of nine Reserve brigades, present throughout the national territory, dozen Special Resistance Corps (grouped around workers contingents of state and private sector enterprises and national institutions at all levels) plus the territorial national service militia commands mentioned, and even a newly created national guards brigade, and in the future, armor and aviation units. It is an autonomous and auxiliary force for the Armed Forces' service branches, with its own chain of command and service arms, reporting directly to the President, the Minister of Defense and the Operational Strategic Command.  It can be estimated at the present time about 400,000 men and women are on various training levels, but the target of its authorities is to reach 1,100,000 part-time servicemen and women in the coming years. Today more than 160,000 men and women serve actively in the militia, with plans to have a half-a-million-strong active force of reserve national servicemen and women in 2015.

Following the 2017 Venezuelan constitutional crisis and its subsequent protests, President Maduro announced the expansion of the militia to include 500,000 personnel, stating that the government would purchase a new rifle for each militiaman, with plans to increase its personnel numbers to about over a million active service personnel plus an undetermined number of reserves.

The next year in December 2018, Maduro claimed that the militia grew by 1.6 million members, he also said during a speech that he would extensively arm the militia.

Controversy
The National Boliviarian Militia has been described as a "political army" created by Hugo Chávez that has hundreds of thousands of members in service, including military reservists and employees of state and public enterprises at all levels. The militia is "under the direct command of the president" as the Commander in Chief of the National Armed Forces (through the authority of the Defense Minister and the Commandant of the Operational Strategic Command) and "are trained to defend the (Bolivarian) revolution of internal and external enemies". It has been alleged by El Mundo that the militia has sometimes used "violence to silence dissent or journalists who do not bow to the discourse of the regime".

Ranks

Equipment of the National Militia

Infantry weapons

See also
Fedayeen Saddam
Iranian Revolutionary Guard Corps
National Defence Forces

References

External links
  Official webpage of the National Militia
  Official webpage of the Ministry of Defense

Military of Venezuela
Military units and formations established in 2009
Militias